Galaxy Evolution Explorer (GALEX or Explorer 83 or SMEX-7) was a NASA orbiting space telescope designed to observe the universe in ultraviolet wavelengths to measure the history of star formation in the universe. In addition to paving the way for future ultraviolet missions, the space telescope allowed astronomers to uncover mysteries about the early universe and how it evolved, as well as better characterize phenomena like black holes and dark matter. The mission was extended three times over a period of 10 years before it was decommissioned in June 2013. GALEX was launched on 28 April 2003 and decommissioned in June 2013.

Spacecraft 
The spacecraft was three-axis stabilized, with power coming from four fixed solar panels. The satellite bus is from Orbital Sciences Corporation based on OrbView 4. The telescope was a  Modified Ritchey–Chrétien with a rotating grism. GALEX used the first ever UV light dichroic beam-splitter flown in space to direct photons to the Near UV (175–280 nanometers) and Far UV (135–174 nanometers) microchannel plate detectors. Each of the two detectors has a  diameter. The target orbit is  circular and inclined at 29.00° to the equator.

Launch 

Mission 
The Galaxy Evolution Explorer (GALEX) which explored the origin and evolution of galaxies, and the origins of stars and heavy elements over the redshift range of Z between 0 and 2. GALEX conducted an all-sky imaging survey, a deep imaging survey, and a survey of 200 galaxies nearest to the Milky Way galaxy. As well, GALEX performed three spectroscopic surveys over the 135–300 nanometre band. GALEX had a planned 29 month mission, and is a part of the Small Explorer (SMEX) program.

The first observation was dedicated to the crew of the Space Shuttle Columbia, and was images in the constellation of Hercules taken on 21 May 2003. This region was selected because it had been directly overhead the shuttle at the time of its last contact with the NASA Mission Control Center, Houston, Texas.

After its primary mission of 29 months, observation operations were extended. In 2009, one of its detectors, which observed in far-ultraviolet light, stopped functioning. Late in the mission, observations of more intense UV sources were allowed, including the Kepler field.

Observation operations were extended to almost 9 years, with NASA placing it into standby mode on 7 February 2012. NASA cut off financial support for operations of GALEX in early February 2011 as it was ranked lower than other projects which were seeking a limited supply of funding. The mission's life-cycle cost to NASA was US$150.6 million. The California Institute of Technology (Caltech) negotiated to transfer control of GALEX and its associated ground control equipment to the California Institute of Technology in keeping with the Stevenson-Wydler Technology Innovation Act. Under this Act, excess research equipment owned by the U.S. government can be transferred to educational institutions and non-profit organizations. On 17 May 2012, GALEX operations were transferred to Caltech.

On 28 June 2013, NASA decommissioned GALEX. It is expected that the spacecraft will remain in orbit for at least 65 years before it will re-enter the atmosphere.

Science mission 

The telescope made observations in ultraviolet wavelengths to measure the history of star formation in the universe 80% of the way back to the Big Bang. Since scientists believe the Universe to be about 13.8 billion years old, the mission studied galaxies and stars across about 10 billion years of cosmic history.

The spacecraft's mission was to observe hundreds of thousands of galaxies, with the goal of determining the distance of each galaxy from Earth and the rate of star formation in each galaxy. Near-UV (NUV) and Far-UV (FUV) emissions as measured by GALEX can indicate the presence of young stars, but may also originate from old stellar populations (e.g. sdB stars).

Partnering with the NASA Jet Propulsion Laboratory (JPL) on the mission were the California Institute of Technology, Orbital Sciences Corporation, University of California, Berkeley, Yonsei University, Johns Hopkins University, Columbia University, and Laboratoire d'Astrophysique de Marseille, France.

The observatory participated in GOALS with Spitzer Space Telescope, Chandra X-ray Observatory, and Hubble Space Telescope. GOALS stands for Great Observatories All-sky LIRG Survey, and Luminous Infrared Galaxies were studied at the multiple wavelengths allowed by the telescopes.

Science objectives 
The primary objective of the Galaxy Evolution Explorer was to learn what factors trigger star formation inside galaxies; how quickly stars form, evolve and die; and how heavy chemical elements form in stars. Additional goals include:

 Determining how fast stars are forming inside each galaxy
 Determining when and how the stars we see today formed
 Creating the first map of the ultraviolet universe
 Helping scientists find and understand ultraviolet bright quasars. These objects can serve as background sources for the Hubble Space Telescope and FUSE as it probes the gases from which galaxies form stars

To accomplish its objectives, the Galaxy Evolution Explorer will conduct eight surveys, grouped into two broad categories – a local universe investigation and a star formation history investigation. The local universe investigation includes the following four surveys:

 All-sky imaging survey – will look at the entire sky and develop a comprehensive catalogue of ultraviolet galaxy images, useful to map the distribution of star formation within the local universe
 Nearby galaxy survey – will study about 150 nearby galaxies that are familiar to scientists to understand how stars formed in individual galaxies
 Wide-field spectroscopic survey – will analyze the light wavelengths of galaxies in a wide swath of the sky
 Medium spectroscopic survey – will examine the light properties of galaxies within a narrower portion of the sky

The star formation history investigation will take information gathered by the local universe investigation and apply it to more distant galaxies by looking further back in time. It includes the following four surveys:

 Deep imaging survey – will look at a portion of the sky to study the distribution of star formation in the deep universe
 Deep spectroscopic survey – will look for the most distant galaxies
 Ultra-deep imaging survey – will look as deep as possible at a very small portion of the sky
 Medium imaging survey – will study star formation in galaxies beyond our local cosmic neighborhood, but not as deep as the deep imaging survey

Telescope specifications 
The telescope had a  diameter aperture primary, in a Ritchey–Chrétien telescope f/6.0 configuration. It can see light wavelengths from 135 nanometres to 280-nm, with a field of view of 1.2° wide (larger than a full Moon). It had gallium arsenide (GaAs) solar cells which supply nearly 300 watts to the spacecraft.

Experiment

Ultraviolet telescope 
GALEX carries a single f/6.0, Ritchey–Chrétien telescope, with a  diameter primary, and a  secondary mirror. Beam-splitters direct the Near UV (NUV) and Far UV (FUV) components to separate photoelectric detectors of diameter . In each, the photoelectrons are multiplied by a microchannel plate, and detected by the anode grid. The grid enables determination of the exact position of electron impact, by the time delay of each pulse at the two ends. The telescope has a field of view (FoV) of 1.2°, and a resolution of five arcseconds, and enables either imaging or spectral composition of a single star/galaxy, by a rotatable wheel containing a clear window and a Grism (Grism is a cross between a grating and a prism).

Pre-launch images

See also 

 Explorer program
 Ultraviolet astronomy
 GALEX Arecibo SDSS Survey
 Arecibo Observatory
 Galaxy And Mass Assembly survey, with GALEX participation

References

External links 

 GALEX website by the California Institute of Technology
 GALEX website by the Jet Propulsion Laboratory
 GALEX data archive by the STScIMAST
 GALEXView Search Tool by the STScIMAST
 GALEX Ultraviolet Sky Survey at Wikisky.org

Satellites orbiting Earth
Explorers Program
Space telescopes
Ultraviolet telescopes
Spacecraft launched in 2003
Spacecraft launched by Pegasus rockets